Floriculture is a significant industry in Taiwan. Taiwan is one of the largest flower exporters in the world and the top producer of orchids.

Overview
In 2011 Taiwan was one of the largest flower exporters in the world and the top producer of orchids.

In 2013, Taiwan harvested flowers with a total value of NT$16.52 billion, in which US$189.7 million of it was exported. Flower plantation land spreads over an area of 138 km2. Chrysanthemum floriculture takes the most land share among other types of flowers. Taiwan is the world's largest exporter of orchids, which represented 87% of the flower export value in 2013. The main export markets for Taiwanese flowers are the United States, Japan and the Netherlands.

Small scale growers receive extensive government and private support, many of these small flower growers are multi-generation family farms.

Tianwei is a traditional center of the industry and is known as the “land of flowers."

History
The high-end orchid industry began in the 1970s with amateurs and hobbyists collecting and cultivating specimens. Due to the economic expansion of Taiwan’s economy during this period these hobbyists where able to devote significant resources to developing and crossbreeding orchids. This created a dedicated local market for very expensive innovative flowers. In the 1980s major Taiwanese corporations noticed the market and began mass production with the help of Dutch companies and cultivation techniques.

In the early 1990s Taiwanese flower producers played an important part in starting the modern floriculture industry in China, particularly around Kunming.

In 2005 Taiwan overtook Thailand as the world’s top orchid producer.

The export oriented flower market suffered during the COVID-19 pandemic with an increase in domestic consumption and government support necessary to keep the industry profitable.

In 2022 Taiwan was by far the largest exporter of orchids to the United States.

Markets
The Taipei Flower Market is the largest plant and flower market in Taiwan.

Organizations 
The Taiwan Floriculture Development Association is the primary industry association. Associations also exist for high value sub-groups such as orchid producers.

See also
 Taiwanese tea
 Banana production in Taiwan
 Taipei International Flora Exposition

References

Taiwan
Horticulture in Taiwan